Arkansas Highway 174 (AR 174, Ark. 174, and Hwy. 174) is a designation for a state highway in Southwest Arkansas. The route is split into two sections. The first section begins at AR 355 in Spring Hill and ends at US Route 67 (US 67) in Hope. The second section begins at US 67 in Perrytown and ends at AR 299 just south of Interstate 30 (I-30). AR 174 is one of the few exceptions to the rule of an even-numbered state highway traveling north to south, rather than east to west.

Route description

Southern segment 

AR 174 begins at AR 355 in Spring Hill. The route heads north for about  before intersecting US 67 in Hope. The route does not intersect any other highways.

Northern segment 

AR 174 begins at US 67 in Perrytown. The route heads north, intersecting the University of Arkansas Southwest Research and Extension Center (unsigned AR 813) along the way, before eventually ending at AR 299 just south of I-30.

Major intersections

References

External links

174
 Transportation in Hempstead County, Arkansas